Shelley Carroll is a Canadian politician who has represented Ward 17 Don Valley North on Toronto City Council since 2018. She previously sat as the councillor for Ward 33 Don Valley East from 2003 to 2018.

Background 
Carroll worked in the banking industry before starting her own childcare business, while caring for her own special needs child. She first rose to prominence as head of the North York Parent Assembly and then the Toronto Educational Assembly. Both groups pushed for more funding for education and vigorously opposed the education reforms brought in by then-premier Mike Harris.

Politics

TDSB trustee 
In the 2000 municipal election, she was elected as a Toronto District School Board (TDSB) trustee in Don Valley East, ousting the incumbent. The school board endured fierce battles over provincial cuts to education, and Carroll became the leader of the faction of the Board refusing to implement the Harris agenda. She was elected Co-Chair of the Board by her peers in her last year in office. For her activism on behalf of children, she was awarded a Golden Jubilee Medal.

Toronto City Council 
In the 2003 municipal election, she decided to run for city council when incumbent Paul Sutherland left to run in the provincial election.  Her main opponent was former west-end councillor Rob Davis. During her first term on council she sat on the Budget Committee and then was elected by her peers to the position of Chair of the Public Works and Infrastructure Committee by mid-term.

After the 2006 municipal election, she was appointed to sit on Mayor David Miller's Executive Committee and was elected Chair of the Budget Committee. Under the governance procedures of the time, only this chair was elected by a majority vote on council, all other standing committee chairs were appointed by the Mayor.

During her four years as Budget Chair, Carroll delivered four City Budgets that were all successfully fully balanced at the time of their launch. She worked with Mayor David Miller to implement Canada's first Municipal Land Transfer Tax, which made Toronto financially sustainable for the first time since amalgamation.

She was re-elected as a City Councillor in 2010 and in 2014. In December 2014, she was appointed to the Toronto Police Services Board by Toronto City Council. She resigned from the Board on March 26, 2018.

Provincial politics 
In October 2016, Carroll announced that she would seek the Liberal Party nomination for the newly formed Don Valley North provincial riding in the next provincial election and was acclaimed as the candidate.

She resigned from City Council on April 5, 2018, in order to run in the 2018 provincial election, but lost to the Progressive Conservative Party candidate Vincent Ke. Jonathan Tsao was appointed by City Council to represent Ward 33 for the remainder of the term before municipal elections on October 22, 2018.

Return to council 
On July 6, 2018, Carroll first announced that she was running for re-election to City Council in Ward 31, renumbered from Ward 33. After the ward boundary changes imposed by the Ontario Government of Doug Ford, Carroll ultimately ran for election in the newly expanded Ward 17 Don Valley North in the 2018 Toronto election. She won by a significant margin over the runner up, Christina Liu, who was endorsed by former-mayor Mel Lastman.

For the 2018–2022 council term, Carroll serves as the vice chair of the North York Community Council, a member of the Toronto Transit Commission Board. as well as being the deputy speaker of Toronto City Council.

Electoral record

References

External links 

 
 
 Shelley Carroll for Don Valley North

Canadian bankers
Living people
Toronto District School Board trustees
Toronto city councillors
Women municipal councillors in Canada
Women in Ontario politics
1957 births